Katzer is a surname. Notable people with the surname include:

Frederick  Katzer (1844–1903), American Roman Catholic archbishop
Friedrich Katzer (1861–1925), Austrian geologist and mineralogist
Hans Katzer (1919–1996), German politician, minister for labour and social affaires
Markus Katzer (born 1979), Austrian footballer
Karl August Katzer( 1822–1904), Sorbian composer and conductor
Nikolaus Katzer (born 1952), German historian
Georg Katzer (1935–2019), German composer

See also
Jacobsen v. Katzer

References